Cecchino may refer to:

 Cecchino dei Bracci, a pupil of Michelangelo
 Tomaso Cecchino, Italian composer; born in Verona, c. 1580; died in Hvar (Croatia), August 31, 1644

See also
Cecchini